The Communist Party of Bhutan (Marxist–Leninist–Maoist) (abbr. CPB (MLM)) is an underground communist party in Bhutan.

The CPB (MLM) aims to start a New Democratic Revolution and overthrow the Bhutanese monarchy and the House of Wangchuck. Its armed wing is the Bhutan Tiger Force, which had an estimated 600 to 1,000 cadres in 2009. The party's leader uses the nom de guerre Comrade Umesh.

History 
In the 1990s, Nepali-speaking Bhutanese peoples protested against the Bhutan government for democratization and language reforms. The government forcibly evicted the protesters, where they were put into refugee camps in eastern Nepal. Those who stayed have faced widespread discrimination. Inside the refugee camps, insurgent groups sprung up, including the Communist Party of Bhutan (Marxist–Leninist–Maoist). The CPB (MLM) was announced publicly on 22 April 2003, as stated on the website of the Communist Party of Nepal (Maoist)—now called Communist Party of Nepal (Maoist Centre), or CPN(M).

The Royal Bhutan Army defused a bomb planted by the CPB (MLM) in Phuentsholing village, near the Bhutan–India border, on 25 April 2007.

During Bhutan's transition to a constitutional monarchy in 2008, the CPB (MLM) insurgents rocked Bhutan with five explosions across the country, including one in the capital Thimphu. They also declared the beginning of a "people's war".
 
In March 2008, Bhutanese police killed five suspected CPB (MLM) insurgents and arrested seventeen more in various operations in the south. The CPB (MLM) ambushed and killed four forest rangers in Singye Dzong on 30 December 2008.

A Bhutanese reporter was arrested in January 2009 after authorities suspected him of being a CPB (MLM) member.

During the 16th South Asian Association of Regional Co-operation, security was tightened after threats by the CPB (MLM).

Ideology 

Shortly after its founding, the CPB (MLM) released a ten-point program which outlined its demands from the government. The party's ideology is oriented around Marxism–Leninism–Maoism; its cadres hope to start a "people's war" and a "New Democratic Revolution".

The group seeks to repatriate the Lhotshampa refugees and declare Bhutan a "sovereign democracy". The CPB (MLM) also wants to turn Bhutan into a republic.

International connections 
The CPB (MLM) has close ties to Maoists in neighbouring Nepal, whom the party considers to be its inspiration. The CPB (MLM) also has links to Naxalite rebels in India's northeast, with CPB (MLM) insurgents reportedly being trained by these groups.

See also
 Communist Party of India (Maoist)
 Naxalite–Maoist insurgency
 Nepalese Civil War
 Unified Communist Party of Nepal (Maoist)

References 

Communist militant groups
Communist parties in Asia
Communism in Bhutan
Banned communist parties
Maoism in Asia
Maoist parties
Paramilitary organisations based in Bhutan
Banned political parties in Bhutan
Republicanism in Bhutan
2003 establishments in Bhutan